The 2017/18 FIS Ski Jumping Alpen Cup was the 28th Alpen Cup season in ski jumping for men and the 10th for ladies.

Other competitive circuits this season included the World Cup, Grand Prix, Continental Cup, FIS Cup and FIS Race.

Calendar

Men

Ladies

Men's team

Standings

Men

Ladies

Ladies' Alpen Cup Tournament

References 

2017 in ski jumping
2018 in ski jumping
FIS Ski Jumping Alpen Cup